Theodoros Angelinos (Greek: Θεόδωρος Αγγελίνος; born 29 May 1984 in Athens, Greece), is a professional tennis player who participates in the ATP International Tennis Tour.

Personal data
Angelinos is the son of Stratos and Eleni Angelinos. He is 6 foot 3 inches tall and weighs 182 pounds. He attended CMA University high school and the University of Virginia.

Tennis career
2010 was the first year that Angelinos played professionally.  He has to date, been nominated a total of five times. His final ranking for 2013 was 256. He garnered a top 1000 ATP ranking in singles and doubles and was a top junior player in Greece even when injured. Angelinos also trained at a high-level tennis academy in Valencia, Spain. He plays right-handed.

Angelinos has won 90.453 $ in prize money and has won 57.4% of all games played. Coach Klein says: "Ted's big-hitting game, height and athleticism make him a can't miss addition to the squad. He has a load of talent and his international experience in singles and doubles has impressed his teammates. He could become the first Greek tennis player to capture the attention of Division I college tennis."

Titles
Angelinos has earned 7 ITF Future singles titles, the last in 2009.

Games won

Year End ATP ranking

References

Greek male tennis players
Greek emigrants to the United States
Living people
1984 births
Sportspeople from Athens
Virginia Cavaliers men's tennis players